Leavitt Lake is a lake in Cass County, Minnesota, in the United States.

Leavitt Lake was named for an early lumberman.

See also
List of lakes in Minnesota

References

Lakes of Minnesota
Lakes of Cass County, Minnesota